Lapidot (lit. Torches) is a moshav in northern Israel. Located near Karmiel and Ma'alot-Tarshiha, it falls under the jurisdiction of Ma'ale Yosef Regional Council.

History
The moshav was established in 1978 by residents of other moshavim in the area.

Economy
Most families are poultry farm residents and residents of a private farm (cows and horses). Part of the population earns a living in industrial area of Tefen and Karmiel.

See also
 Amos Lapidot (1934–2019), Israeli fighter pilot, 10th Commander of the Israeli Air Force, and President of Technion – Israel Institute of Technology

References

Moshavim
Populated places established in 1978
Populated places in Northern District (Israel)
1978 establishments in Israel